Santa Cruz Michapa is a municipality in the Cuscatlán department of El Salvador with a population of 12,225 (2001). It celebrates the Fiesta de la Santa Cruz every May 3.

External links
Article in Spanish

Municipalities of the Cuscatlán Department